The men's snowboard halfpipe competition of the FIS Freestyle Ski and Snowboarding World Championships 2017 was held at Sierra Nevada, Spain on March 10 (qualifying)  and March 11 (finals). 
34 athletes from 14 countries competed.

Qualification
The following are the results of the qualification.

Final
The following are the results of the finals.

References

Snowboard halfpipe, men's